Äggakaka (English: Egg cake) is a traditional Scanian dish that is similar to kolbullar or oven pancake (ugnspankaka), that is served with fried slices of pork belly and lingon berries. It used to be made for farmworkers as it was easy to wrap up and eat out on the fields.

Preparation 
When making äggakaka a batter similar to pancakes is prepared, but with more eggs and flour to make a creamier consistency. It is also common that grounded black pepper is added to the batter. For frying; either the fat left over from the pork mixed with butter is used, or just plain butter. When frying with just plain butter, the melted butter is later poured over the finished äggakaka as it contains a rich pork flavor.

During cooking enough batter needs to be poured into the pan to create a thickness of at least 5 centimeters. To prevent burning of the äggakaka's underside the batter needs to be lifted continuously until it has a firm but creamy consistency.

When the batter has almost solidified it is time to flip the cake. A big plate is put on the pan, which is then turned upside-down. More butter is added to the pan, and, when melted,  the äggakaka is carefully returned into the pan by letting it slide off the plate, with the uncooked side downwards. When both sides are golden brown the äggakaka is finished.

Unlike kolbullen, äggakaka is made with a generous amount of eggs, thereof the name, and is fried in lots of butter. Äggakaka also requires proper kitchen equipment. According to some recipes, the äggakaka needs to be baked in an oven, but then it becomes more similar to an oven pancake and loses its characteristic butter fried surface.

Serving 
Äggakaka is always served with fried smoked pork. The fried pork is sometimes sliced or diced into the batter before cooking the äggakaka. However, this causes the pork flavor to become weak. It is therefore more common to fry the pork separately, and then add it on top the finished äggakaka together with its melted fat.

Lingonberry jam is a common condiment to äggakaka. This is however a newer tradition as there is only a limited amount of lingonberries in the Scanian nature. A more common condiment in the older days used to be apple sauce or butter fried apple slices.

References 

Swedish cuisine